= Action type approach =

Pseudoscientific mental exercises

The action type approach is a series of mental exercises—variously described as "pseudoscientific", "empirically challenged", or a "neuromyth"— that purport to increase physical performance in athletes.
